Harry C. Baker (1886 or 1887 – August 23, 1939) was an American entrepreneur most notable for his involvement with the construction of roller coasters.  Through partnerships and later, as president of the Harry C. Baker Company, Baker would be involved with notable designs such as the Cyclone at Coney Island, the Blue Streak at Woodcliffe Pleasure Park, and Jack Rabbit at Kennywood.

Biography

Baker was the former manager of Rexford Park, Schnectady, New York and served on the staff at Riverview Park in Chicago. From 1920 to 1923, Baker served as the Secretary and Treasurer of the John A. Miller-led Miller & Baker, Inc. Serving as office manager of the firm's Grand Central Terminal location, he was involved with the construction of over 40 coasters.

In 1923, Baker went on to form his own company.  In 1927, the Rosenthal brothers contracted with Baker's firm and designer Vernon Keenan to build the Coney Island Cyclone.  After the success of this endeavor, Keenan and Baker once again teamed to build one of the most debated roller coasters of the 1920s, the Blue Streak at Woodcliffe Pleasure Park.

Coasters
During his lifetime, Baker was involved in the building of nearly 40 roller coasters, mostly with John A. Miller.

References

External links
 John A. Miller site

Amusement ride manufacturers
Roller coaster designers
Year of birth missing